The 2004 Connecticut State Senate elections took place as part of the biennial 2004 United States Elections. All 36 seats of the Connecticut State Senate were up for re-election. Senators serve two-year terms and are up for re-election every election cycle. The August 10th primary elections decided candidates that appeared on the ballot for the General election. The General Election took place on November 2, 2004.

Summary

Results 
The Democrats kept the majority with a 21-15 Majority.

District 1

District 2

District 3

District 4

District 5

District 6

District 7

District 8

District 9

District 10

District 11

District 12

District 13

District 14

District 15

District 16

District 17

District 18

District 19

District 20

District 21

District 22

District 23

District 24

District 25

District 26

District 27

District 28

District 29

District 30

District 31

District 32

District 33

District 34

District 35

District 36

References

State_Senate_election
Connecticut_State_Senate_election
Connecticut State Senate elections